Benjamin John Cowling  (born 11 June 1980) is a British epidemiologist and medical statistician. He is the current Chair Professor of Epidemiology and Head of the Division of Epidemiology and Biostatistics at the School of Public Health, University of Hong Kong (HKU).

Early life and education 
Cowling was raised in Sonning, England. He attended Sonning Church of England Primary School and, from 1990 to 1997, Reading School.

He obtained his BSc in mathematics, operational research, statistics, and economics (MORSE) in 2000 from the University of Warwick, and then a PhD from the same university in 2003.

Career and research 
After his PhD, Cowling joined the Imperial College London as a postdoctoral research statistician.

He moved to Hong Kong in 2004, first as a senior research assistant at the School of Public Health of the University of Hong Kong (HKU), climbing the ranks gradually and becoming an Assistant Professor in 2008. He was promoted to Associate Professor in 2013, when he started to head the Division of Epidemiology and Biostatistics. He became Chair Professor of Epidemiology around November 2021. He now heads the World Health Organisation Collaborating Centre for Infectious Disease Epidemiology and Control at HKU.

Cowling's research is mostly about infectious disease epidemiology, including field studies of respiratory virus transmission, the effectiveness of influenza vaccines and infection immunity. During the COVID-19 pandemic, he and his team shifted the focus to the COVID-19 disease.

He also gave interviews to multiple local and global media throughout the COVID-19 pandemic.

Currently outside HKU, Cowling is the editor-in-chief the editor-in-chief of Influenza and Other Respiratory Viruses, the Head of the MIDAS network (a group of global infectious disease experts that study them with computational methods), a member of the Center for Communicable Disease Dynamics at the Harvard T.H. Chan School of Public Health, Harvard University. He also sits on the Council of the International Society for Influenza and other Respiratory Virus Diseases.

Honours and awards 
 Fellow of the Faculty of Public Health (2014)
 Member of the Order of the British Empire (MBE) (2021)

References 

Living people
British epidemiologists
Academic staff of the University of Hong Kong
Officers of the Order of the British Empire
Alumni of the University of Warwick
Public health researchers
Fellows of the Faculty of Public Health
Academic journal editors
1979 births